Dr Chiu Hin-kwong, OBE, JP (born 23 May 1928) is a Hong Kong doctor. He is also a former member of the Executive Council and Legislative Council of Hong Kong.

Biography
Dr Chiu was born on 23 May 1928 in Hong Kong. He studied at the King's College, Hong Kong and moved to China during the Japanese occupation of Hong Kong and was educated at the Lingnan Middle School in Guangdong and Pui Ching & Pui To Middle School in Kweilin. He returned to Hong Kong after war and graduated with the Bachelor of Medicine, Bachelor of Surgery from the University of Hong Kong in 1953. He became a doctor in private practice and was a fellow of the Hong Kong College of General Practitioners.

He had been vice-president of the Hong Kong Medical Association and member of the Licentiate Committee of the Medical Council and Dental Council of Hong Kong. He was also council member of the Hong Kong branch of the British Medical Association and director of the Hong Kong Baptist Hospital.

He was elected to the Legislative Council through the Medical functional constituency in 1985 and was appointed to the Executive Council by Governor Edward Youde in 1986 with Daniel Tse.

He lost his seat in the 1988 election to Dr Leong Che-hung.

References

1928 births
Alumni of King's College, Hong Kong
Hong Kong medical doctors
Hong Kong Christians
Officers of the Order of the British Empire
Members of the Executive Council of Hong Kong
Alumni of the University of Hong Kong
HK LegCo Members 1985–1988
Living people